Jordan Alexander Feliz (born March 15, 1989) is an American Christian musician, who plays a folk rock and soul style of Christian pop. He has released four studio albums that have charted, along with several singles, on various Billboard charts.

Early and personal life
Jordan Alexander Feliz, was born on March 15, 1989, in Clovis, California, the son of Richard Edward Feliz and Jennie Elaine Feliz (née, Wren). He graduated from Buchanan High School, in 2007. His music career was facilitated by the members of A Current Affair, reaching out to him via his Myspace page, during 2006 in search of a lead vocalist. He is married to his high school sweetheart, Jamie. They reside in Nashville, Tennessee, with their  daughter, Jolie. He used to be an automobile valet.

Music career
His music career started in 2006, with the band, A Current Affair, but after five years with them the band was broken up. It was not until 2015 that his solo music career commenced. The first studio album, Beloved, was released on October 2, 2015, from Centricity Music. The song, "The River", charted on three Billboard magazine charts the Christian Songs at No. 2, Christian Airplay at No. 1, and Christian Digital Songs at No. 2. His second studio album, The River, was released on April 22, 2016, from Centricity Music.

In 2018 he released his third studio album, Future. "Changed", "Witness" and "Faith" were released as singles along with a radio version of "Faith" and a remix, "Faith FE".

Preparing for his fourth album, Feliz released the singles "Glorify", "Glorify (featuring TobyMac and Terrian)" and "Wounds".

Discography

Studio albums

Singles

As lead artist

As featured artist

Awards and nominations 
GMA Dove Awards

Notes

References

External links
 

1989 births
Living people
American performers of Christian music
Musicians from Fresno, California
Musicians from Nashville, Tennessee
Songwriters from California
Songwriters from Tennessee
Centricity Music artists
American folk-pop singers
21st-century American singers